The 1990–91 Auburn Tigers men's basketball team represented Auburn University in the 1990-91 college basketball season. The team's head coach was Tommy Joe Eagles, who was in his second season at Auburn. The team played their home games at Joel H. Eaves Memorial Coliseum in Auburn, Alabama. They finished the season 13–16, 5–13 in SEC play, good for seventh in the conference. They defeated LSU to advance to the second round of the SEC tournament where they lost to Alabama.

The team's newest key addition was freshman guard Wesley Person, younger brother of former Auburn and NBA star Chuck Person.  Person attended high school in Brantley, Alabama like his brother.  Person averaged 15.4 points per game, second on the team to Ronnie Battle.

Roster

References

Auburn Tigers men's basketball seasons
Auburn Tigers
Auburn Tigers